Elton Koça (born 5 May 1973) is a retired Albanian football player.

Club career
Koça began his playing career with Teuta Durrës, the club with whom he would win the 1993–94 Albanian championship. In 1997, he moved to Greece to play for Agios Nikolaos. He would also play for Panegialios in the Beta Ethniki before joining Kallithea.

International career
He made his debut for Albania in a November 1995 friendly match against Bosnia in Tirana and earned a total of 2 caps, scoring no goals. His other international was also a friendly against Bosnia in April 1996.

References

External links

1973 births
Living people
Footballers from Durrës
Albanian footballers
Association football forwards
Albania international footballers
KF Teuta Durrës players
KS Lushnja players
Agios Nikolaos F.C. players
Panegialios F.C. players
Kallithea F.C. players
Levadiakos F.C. players
Kategoria Superiore players
Albanian expatriate footballers
Expatriate footballers in Greece
Albanian expatriate sportspeople in Greece